Gressenberg is an area of western Styria, Austria. Until 2014, Gressenberg was a municipality in the district of Deutschlandsberg in the Austrian state of Styria. Since the 2015 Styria municipal structural reform, it is part of the municipality Schwanberg.

Population

References

Cities and towns in Deutschlandsberg District